Kamini may refer to:

 KAMINI, a research reactor at Indira Gandhi Center for Atomic Research in Kalpakkam, India
 Kamini (film), a 1974 Indian Malayalam film

Places
 Kamini, Mummidivaram Mandal, a village in Andhra Pradesh, India
 Kamini River, in Maharashtra, India
 Kamini, a settlement and port on the island of Hydra, Greece
 Kamini Yacht Club, a yacht club on Hydra

Given name
 Kamini (rapper) (born 1979), French rapper
 Kamini Mohan Dewan (1890–1976), Bangladeshi politician
 Kamini Kumar Dutta (1878–1959), Pakistani Bengali politician
 Kamini Gadhok, British speech and language therapist
 Kamini Jain (born 1969), Libyan-born Canadian sprint kayaker
 Kamini Jaiswal, Indian lawyer
 Kamini Jindal (born 1988), Indian politician
 Kamini Kadam (1933–2000), Indian actress
 Kamini Kaushal (born 1927), Hindi actress
 Kamini Nirmala Mendis, Sri Lankan malaria expert and academic
 Kamini Pather (born 1983), South African chef and media personality
 Kamini A. Rao (born 1953), Indian gynecologist
 Kamini Roy (1864–1933), Indian Bengali poet, social worker, and feminist
 Kamini Singha (born 1977), American geologist and academic

Fictional characters
 Kamini, in the TV series Kamini Damini
 Kamini Verma, in the 1980 film Karz
 Kamini Devi Verma, in the 2008 film Karzzzz

See also
 Kaminia (disambiguation)